Michael John Block (28 January 1940 – 12 December 2019) was an English professional footballer who played as a right winger. He made nearly 200 Football League appearances for Chelsea, Brentford and Watford over a 10-year period.

Career
Born in Ipswich, Block began his career with the youth team at First Division club Chelsea and played in both legs of the 1958 FA Youth Cup Final. Block progressed to the Chelsea first team and made 40 appearances and scored six goals between 1957 and 1962.

Block left Chelsea for Brentford for £5,000 in January 1962. While with Brentford, he was the provider of assists for many goals scored by the club's all-international frontline of Johnny Brooks, Billy McAdams and John Dick. He later played for Watford, before dropping into non-League football with Chelmsford City in 1967.

Honours 
Brentford
 Football League Fourth Division: 1962–63
 London Challenge Cup: 1964–65

Individual

 Brentford Supporters' Player of the Year: 1962–63

Career statistics

References 

1940 births
English footballers
Chelsea F.C. players
Brentford F.C. players
Watford F.C. players
Chelmsford City F.C. players
English Football League players
Association football wingers
England youth international footballers
2019 deaths